Patrick Alan Nunnelee (October 9, 1958 – February 6, 2015) was an American businessman and politician who served as the U.S. representative for  from 2011 until his death in 2015. Previously he served in the Mississippi State Senate, representing the 6th district, from 1995 to 2011. He was a member of the Republican Party.

Early life, education, and business career
Nunnelee was born in Tupelo, Mississippi. Nunnelee graduated from Clinton High School in Clinton, Mississippi, in 1976 and then attended Mississippi State University (MSU), graduating with a bachelor's degree in 1980. While a student at MSU, he lost much of his eyesight to a degenerative eye disease. Although legally blind he continued his studies. His sight was restored after receiving cornea transplants.

Nunnelee was employed by American Funeral Assurance Co., eventually becoming vice president of sales and marketing. His father was also employed by the company, rising to president and CEO. In 1996, Nunnelee and his father founded Allied Funeral Associates, Inc. and Allied Funeral Associates Insurance Company and he has served as Vice-President and Director of both entities.

Before beginning his political career he was a popular speaker, crediting God, organ donors, and organizations such as the Lions Club for having his eyesight restored.

Mississippi Senate

Elections
In 1995, incumbent Republican State Senator Roger Wicker of the 6th district resigned in order to take up a seat in the U.S. House of Representatives. Nunnelee ran and won. In 1999, he won re-election to a second term unopposed. In 2003, he won re-election to a third term with 69% of the vote. In 2007, he won re-election to a fourth term with 66% of the vote.

Committee assignments
 Senate Committee on Appropriations

U.S. House of Representatives

Elections

2010

In the November 2010 general election, Nunnelee defeated Democratic incumbent U.S. Congressman Travis Childers 55%-41%.

2012

After redistricting, Eupora Mayor Henry Ross and businessman Robert Estes ran against Nunnelee in the Republican primary. Nunnelee won the March 2012 primary with 57% of the vote. Ross received 29% and Estes 14%.

2014

Nunnelee ran for re-election in 2014. He was the only Congressman in Mississippi who did not face a primary opponent in 2014.

Nunnelee won the general election with 68% of the vote.

Tenure
In 2011, Nunnelee became a co-sponsor of Bill H.R.3261 otherwise known as the Stop Online Piracy Act.

Committee assignments
 Committee on Appropriations
 Subcommittee on Agriculture, Rural Development, Food and Drug Administration, and Related Agencies
 Subcommittee on Energy and Water Development
 Subcommittee on Military Construction, Veterans Affairs, and Related Agencies

Caucus memberships
 Congressional Diabetes Caucus
 Congressional Prayer Caucus
 Immigration Reform Caucus
 International Conservation Caucus
 Sportsmen's Caucus
 Congressional Cement Caucus
 Congressional Constitution Caucus

Personal life
Nunnelee was a Southern Baptist. He married Tori Bedells, a native of Clinton, Mississippi, a graduate of University of Southern Mississippi Nursing School. They had three children.

Death
Nunnelee underwent brain surgery at University of Texas MD Anderson Cancer Center after the discovery of a mass in his brain in May 2014. He was brought to TIRR Memorial Hermann Hospital and later Johns Hopkins Hospital to undergo chemotherapy and radiation and receive therapy to restore his speech and mobility on the left side of his body.

Nunnelee died at his home in Tupelo on February 6, 2015, aged 56. President Barack Obama, in an official statement from the White House Press Office, stated: "Michelle and I were saddened to learn of the passing of Representative Alan Nunnelee. Alan represented the people of his beloved Mississippi for two decades, first as a state senator and then in Congress.  A proud son of Tupelo, Alan never wavered in his determination to serve the men and women who placed their trust in him, even as he bravely battled the illness that ultimately took his life. As a Sunday School teacher and a deacon at his church, Alan believed deeply in the power of faith and the strength of American families. Today, our thoughts and prayers are with Alan's family – his wife Tori, their children and grandchildren, and all those who loved him."

The funeral services were held on February 9 in Calvary Baptist Church, Tupelo, Mississippi.

See also
 List of United States Congress members who died in office

References

External links
 
 
 

1958 births
2015 deaths
20th-century American businesspeople
20th-century American politicians
20th-century Baptists
21st-century American businesspeople
21st-century American politicians
21st-century Baptists
Baptists from Mississippi
Businesspeople from Mississippi
Deaths from brain cancer in the United States
Deaths from cancer in Mississippi
Mississippi State University alumni
Republican Party Mississippi state senators
Neurological disease deaths in Mississippi
People from Clinton, Mississippi
People from Columbus, Mississippi
Politicians from Tupelo, Mississippi
Republican Party members of the United States House of Representatives from Mississippi